Paul Badré (May 22, 1906 – August 10, 2000) was a French aviator who fought in the Second World War.

Biograpahy 
Paul Badré was the brother of Jean Badré, bishop of Paris and Bayeux. After graduating from the Polytechnique university in 1926, he joined the French Air Force and obtained his pilot's license in 1929. In 1935, he became a test pilot at the air material test center in Villacoublay.

In August 1940, he joined the French delegation of the German Armistice Commission. He remained there until January 1941, joining the French Resistance while still in Vichy. From the attic of his house in Bellerive-sur-Allier, he transmitted to London the telephone communications between the occupying forces and their high command. This interception operation was orchestrated by the engineer Robert Keller, who was denounced in December 1942 and died during deportation. In 1943, Paul Badré joined the Intelligence Service in London and then travelled to French North Africa where he took command of the Franche-Comté bombing squadron.

On August 1, 1945, after the French Liberation, he was the first Frenchman to fly a jet aircraft on French territory: at the inauguration of the Brétigny-sur-Orge flight test center, of which he flew a Messerschmitt Me 262 taken from the enemy. He supervised the flight test department of SNECMA (1946-1948), became director of production at Sud-Ouest (1948-1957), then a technical advisor to the president of Sud-Aviation (1958-1969), the president of Sferma (1963-1969) and of Maroc-Aviation (1966-1972), and the director of Bertin et Cie (1965-81). He was also president of the association "Clubs automobiles de marque" (1968-1997) and an honorary member of the French Air and Space Academy.

Awards 

  Legion of Honour
  Croix de Guerre 1939-1945
  Aeronautical Medal

References 

Recipients of the Aeronautical Medal
Recipients of the Croix de Guerre 1939–1945 (France)
Commandeurs of the Légion d'honneur
Test pilots
French Resistance members
French aviators
French World War II pilots
French military personnel of World War II
École Polytechnique alumni